Jonathan Stone-Fewings (born 1967) is an English actor. He studied at Hereford College of Arts and at the Welsh College of Music and Drama, and began his career in 1989. He has been a member of the Royal Shakespeare Company (RSC) since 1994. He first performed with the National Theatre playing Barrildo in Declan Donnellan's Fuenteovejuna at the Cottesloe Theatre.

In 2008 he took over the lead role of Richard Hannay in The 39 Steps at the Criterion in London's West End. He performed the role of Gerry in the revival of Brian Friel's Dancing at Lughnasa at the Old Vic in London and has recently performed the role of Orsino in Twelfth Night for the RSC.

In 2015 he was appointed a Fellow of Hereford College of Arts.

Family
He married English actress Nancy Carroll in 2003. The couple have two children, Nellie and Arthur.

Selected theatre credits

Reviews and articles
"Jo Stone-Fewings On ... Stepping into a Global Hit" by Kate Jackson, whatsonstage.com (16 June 2008)
"The Big Interview", Official London Theatre Guide (11 June 2008)
"The 39 Steps Celebrates", Official London Theatre Guide (14 May 2008)
"Photo Flash; Stone-Fewings Joins 39 Steps", Broadway World (24 April 2008)
"Stone-Fewings Steps into New Role", Official London Theatre Guide] (18 March 2008)
"The Country Wife" by Michael Coveney, whatsonstage.com (10 October 2007)
"Angels In America" by Michael Coveney, whatsonstage.com (27 June 2007)
"See How They Run" by Michael Coveney, whatsonstage.com (30 June 2006)
"Twelfth Night" by Maxwell Cooter, whatsonstage.com (4 January 2002)
"The Taming of the Shrew" by Maxwell Cooter, whatsonstage.com (8 November 1999)
"Cymbeline" by Birna Helgadóttir, whatsonstage.com (26 March 1998)

Television and film

References

External links

1967 births
Living people
Alumni of the Royal Welsh College of Music & Drama
English male soap opera actors
English male stage actors
English male film actors
Royal Shakespeare Company members
English male Shakespearean actors
People from Hereford
Date of birth missing (living people)